CKMA-FM is a Canadian radio station, broadcasting at 93.7 FM in Miramichi, New Brunswick. Owned by Radio-MirAcadie Inc., the station broadcasts a French-language community radio format for the region's Acadian community.

On June 14, 2010, CKMA-FM applied to the CRTC to add a transmitter at Neguac, New Brunswick to operate on 102.9 MHz which received approval on August 6, 2010. Neguac's repeater callsign will be CKMA-FM-1. 

The station is a member of the Alliance des radios communautaires du Canada.

References

External links
 Radio MirAcadie
 
 

Mass media in Miramichi, New Brunswick
Kma
Kma
Kma
Media cooperatives in Canada
Radio stations established in 2006
2006 establishments in New Brunswick